The Division Three League is the third tier football league in Ghana. It is three tiers below the Ghana Premier League.

League structure
The league is made up of twenty teams.

2019–20 teams
  Jancole Football Academy (Darkuman-Accra)
  Akotex F.C. (Tema)
 Cornerstones
 Dumas Boys of GTP (Tema)
 Dunkwa-On-Offin Starke F.C.
 Ghapoha F.C.
 Monsasonic F.C. 
 Great Ashantis
 Mankessim Striking Force
 Neoplan Stars
 Palma F.C. 
 S.C. Adelaide
 Techiman Universal Stars
 Thirds World
 18yardbox Football Club
 Voradep
 Accra Angels soccer academy (Dansoman)
 Sharp Arrows (Kanda 441)
 Great African United
 Royal Eagle F.C. (Dansoman)
 Ghanaba Soccer Academy

Football in Ghana